This is the filmography of Vincent Price (May 27, 1911 – October 25, 1993), which includes appearances in theatre and television. Price made his theatre debut in the Gate Theatre's production of Chicago (1935), followed by work on Broadway. Under contract to Universal, Price traveled to Hollywood, making his screen debut in Service de Luxe (1938). By the 1960s, Vincent Price was working almost exclusively in the horror genre and teen film genres. Price's final film was Edward Scissorhands (1990) and the TV movie The Heart of Justice (1992) was his last screen appearance. Price died in Los Angeles, California on October 25, 1993.

Film

Television

Radio

Theatre

Discography

Books 

 Price, Vincent, I Like What I Know – A Visual Autobiography. Garden City, New York: Doubleday, 1959.
 Price, Vincent, The book of Joe; about a dog and his man. Doubleday, 1961; OCLC 1292943
 Price, Vincent and Price, Mary Grant, A Treasury of Great Recipes. Bernard Geis Associates, 1965; .
 Price, Vincent and Price, Mary Grant, Mary and Vincent Price Present A National Treasury of Cookery. Heirloom Publishing Company, 1967; OCLC 1450485
 Price, Vincent and Price, Mary Grant, Come Into the Kitchen Cook Book: A Collector's Treasury of America's Great Recipes. Stravon Educational Press, 1969; 
 Price, Vincent, Cooking Price-wise with Vincent Price. Corgi Children's, 1971; 
 Price, Vincent, The Vincent Price Treasury of American Art. Waukesha, Wisconsin: Country Beautiful Corporation, 1972; .
 Price, Vincent, Vincent Price: His Movies, His Plays, His Life. Doubleday & Co, 1978;

References

External links 

 
 
 

Male actor filmographies
American filmographies